Harari is an Ethiopian Semitic language spoken by the Harari people of Ethiopia. According to the 2007 Ethiopian census, it is spoken by 25,810 people. Most of its speakers are multilingual in Amharic and/or Eastern Oromo. Harari is closely related to the Eastern Gurage languages, Zay, and Silt'e, all of whom are linked to the now extinct Semitic Harla language. Locals or natives of Harar refer to it as Gēy Sinan or Gēy Ritma "language of the City" (Gēy is the word for how Harari speakers refer to Harar, whose name is an exonym).

Harari was originally written with a version of the Arabic script, then the Ethiopic script was adopted to write the language. Some Harari speakers in diaspora write their language with the Latin alphabet.

Vowels
/æ, a, e, ai, ɪ, i/

Grammar

Nouns

Number
Wolf Leslau discusses Harari–East Gurage phonology and grammar:
The noun has two numbers, Singular and Plural. The affix -ač changes singulars into plurals:

 abōč, a man;  abōčač, men.
 wandaq, a servant;  wandaqač, servants.
 gar, a house;  garač, houses.

Nouns ending in a or i become plural without reduplicating this letter:
 gafa, a slave;  gafač, slaves.
 gubna, a harlot;  gubnač, harlots.
 liğği, a son;   liğğač, sons.
 mäqbärti, a grave;  mäqbärtač, graves.

/s/ alternates with /z/:
 färäz, a horse;  färäzač, horses.
 iraaz, toga;  iraazač, togas.

Gender
Masculine nouns may be converted into feminines by three processes. The first changes the terminal vowel into -it, or adds -it to the terminal consonant:

 rágá, an old man;   rágít, an old woman.
 buchí, male dog;  buchít, female dog
 wasíf, a slave boy;  wasífít, a slave girl.

Animals of different sexes have different names. and this forms the second process:

 bárá, an ox; lám, a cow.

The third and the most common way of expressing sex is by means of aboch, "male or man," and inistí: woman, "female", corresponding to English " he-" and " she-":

 aboch faraz, a stallion; inistí faraz, a mare.
 aboch č̣abar a he mule; inistí č̣abar, a she mule.

Pronouns

The affixed pronouns or possessives attached to nouns are:--

Singular.

 1st Pers. - e, my or mine. : Gár-e, my house.
 2nd Pers. - khá, thy or thine.   Gár-khá, thy house.
 3rd Pers. - zo, or - so, his.  Gár-zo, his house.

Plural.
 1st Pers. - zinya or sinya, our. : Gár-zinya, our house.
 2nd Pers. - kho, your. Gár-kho, your house.
 3rd Pers. - ziyu or siyu, their. Gár-ziyu, their house. (384)

In the same way attached pronouns are affixed to verbs:

 Sit-ayn: give (thou to) me.
 Sit-ana: give (thou to) us.

The demonstrative pronouns are:

 Sing. Yí, this.
  Yá', that.
 Plur. Yíách, these.
  Yá'ách, those.

The interrogative pronouns are the following:

 Mántá: who?
 Mintá: what?

 Án atti'e hárkho: I myself went.
  Akhákh attikha hárkhí: thou thyself wentest.
  Azo attiizo hára: he himself went.

Verbs
The following are the two auxiliary verbs:

Past Tense.

 Sing.  1. I became: Án ikaní náarkho.
  2. Thou becamest:  Akhákh tikání nárkhí.
  3. He became: Azo ikáni nárá.
 Plur.  1. We became: Innách nikání nárná.
  2. Ye became:  Akhákhách tikání nárkhú.
  3. They became:  Aziyách ikání nárú.

Present Tense.

 Sing.  1. I become: Án ikánákh.
  2. Thou becomest:  Akhákh tikánákh.
  3. He becomes:  Azo ikánál.
 Plur.  1. We become:  Inyách nikánáná.
  2. Ye become:  Akhákhách tikánákhu.
  3. They become: Aziyách yikánálú.

Imperative.

  Become thou,  "Kanni".   Become ye,  "Kánnú".

Prohibitive.

 Sing. 2. Become not,  ikánnumekh.
 Plur. 2. Become not ye,  tikánnumekhu.

Past Tense.

(Affirmative Form.)

 Sing. 1. I went, Án letkho.
  2. Thous wentest, Akhákh letkhí.
  3. He went, Azo leta.
 Plur. 1. We went, Inyách letna.
  2. Ye went, Akhákhách letkhú.
  3. They went, Aziyách letú.

(Negative Form.)

 Sing. 1. I went not, Án alletkhúm.
  2. Thou wentest not, Akbákh alletkhím.
  3. He went not, Azo alletám.
 Plur. 1. We went not, Inyách aletnám.
  2. Ye went not, Akhákách alletkhúm.
  3. They went not, Azziyách alletúm.

Present Tense.

(Affirmative Form.)

 1. I go, Án iletákh 1. Inyásh niletáná.
 2. Thou goest, Akhákh tiletínakh  2. Akhákhách tiletákhú.
 3. He goes, Azo yiletál  3. Azziyách yiletálú.

(Negative Form.)

 Sing. 1. I go not, Án iletumekh.
 2. Thou goest not, Akhákh tiletumekh.
 3. He goes not, Azo yiletumel.
 Plur. 1. We go not, Inyách niletumena.
  2. Ye go not, Akhákhach tiletumekhú.
 3. They go not, Azziyách iletuelú.

 Sing. 1. I will go, Án iletle halkho.
 2. Thou wilt go,  Akháhk tiletle halkhí.
  3. He will go, Azo iletle hal.
 Plur. 1. We will go, Inyách niletle halns.
  2. Ye will go, Akhákhách tiletle halkhú.
 3. They will go, Azziyách niletle halns.

Writing system
Harari was originally written in an unmodified and later modified Arabic Script. The Ethiopic script was then adopted to write Harari. There is a Latin version of the script used by the Harari diaspora.

Modified Arabic script

Vowel Markings Table

Modified Ge'ez script

Harari can be written in the unmodified Ethiopic script as most vowel differences can be disambiguated from context.
The Harari adaptation of the Ethiopic script adds a long vowel version of the Ethiopic/Amharic vowels by adding a dot on top of the letter.
In addition certain consonants are pronounced differently when compared to the Amharic pronunciation.

The table below shows the Harari alphasyllabary with the Romanized & IPA consonants along the rows and the Romanized vowel markings along the columns.

Modified Latin script

Numerals
 1. Ahad
 2. Ko'ot
 3. Shi'ishti
 4. Haret
 5. Ham'misti
 6. Siddisti
 7. Sa'ati
 8. Su'ut
 9. Zahtegn
 10. Asir
11. Asra ahad
12. Asra ko'ot
13. Asra shi'ishti
14. Asra haret
15. Asra ham'misti
16. Asra siddisti
17. Asra sa'ati
18. Asra su'ut
19. Asra zahtegn
20. Kuya
30. Saasa
40. Arbîn
50. Hamsein
60. Sit'tin
70. Sa'ati asir
80. Su'ut asir
90. Zahtana
100. Baqla
1,000. Kum or Alfi

References

Works cited
Abdurahman Garad and Ewald Wagner. 1998. Harari-Studien : Texte mit Übersetzung, grammatischen Skizzen und Glossar. Wiesbaden: Harrassowitz. . 
Cerulli, Enrico. “La lingua e la storia di Harar” in Studi Etiopici, vol. I, 1936 (Roma).
Gardner, Simon and Ralph Siebert. 2001. "Sociolinguistic survey report of the Zay language area." SIL Electronic Survey Reports, 2002-024. PDF
Cohen, Marcel. 1931. Etudes d'éthiopien méridional. Paris. pp. 243–354.

Leslau, Wolf. 1958. The verb in Harari : (South Ethiopic). Berkeley: University of California Press.
 

Mondon-Vidailhet, François Marie Casimir. 1902. La langue Harari et les dialectes Ethiopies du Gouraghe. Paris: Imprimerie nationale.
Wagner, Ewald. 1983. Harari-Texte in arabischer Schrift : mit Übersetzung und Kommentar. Wiesbaden: F. Steiner.

External links
 World Atlas of Language Structures information on Harari
 Grammatical Outline and Vocabulary of the Harari Language

Languages of Ethiopia
Transverse Ethiopian Semitic languages